Little Britain is a street in the City of London running from St. Martin's Le Grand in the east to West Smithfield in the west. It is situated in the Aldersgate and Farringdon Within wards. Postman's Park is also bounded by Little Britain.

Historically, Little Britain referred to a small district in the City just north of London Wall, including this street.

Washington Irving described this district in The Sketch Book of Geoffrey Crayon, Gent., published in 1820. The opening paragraph reads:

Booksellers dominated the street from the mid-16th century, followed by goldsmiths and clothing trades from the mid-18th to the 20th centuries.

Cultural references
Little Britain is mentioned in Charles Dickens' novel Great Expectations as the location of Jaggers' office. It is also mentioned in Waverley by Sir Walter Scott in connection with the publication of a manuscript.  It is not correct, as often said, that the name comes from a medieval Breton enclave, or a possession of the Dukes of Brittany.

Transport
The nearest London Underground stations are St Paul's (Central line) and Barbican (Circle, Hammersmith & City and Metropolitan lines) and the closest mainline railway stations are City Thameslink and Moorgate.

References

Further reading
Full text of Irving's account, at WikiSource
 Victorian London - Districts - Little Britain
 BHO : The Records of St. Bartholomew's Priory and St. Bartholomew the Great, West Smithfield: Volume 2, pp.213-231
Streets in the City of London
History of the City of London